Lakeside is a census-designated place (CDP) in Henrico County, Virginia, United States. It is an inner suburb of Richmond, Virginia. The population was 11,849 at the 2010 census.

Geography
Lakeside is located at  (37.610695, −77.475747).

Demographics

As of the census of 2000, there were 11,157 people, 4,982 households, and 2,909 families residing in the CDP. The population density was 2,657.1 people per square mile (1,025.7/km2). There were 5,177 housing units at an average density of 1,232.9/sq mi (475.9/km2). The racial makeup of the CDP was 86.16% White, 8.75% African American, 0.61% Native American, 1.43% Asian, 0.07% Pacific Islander, 1.22% from other races, and 1.76% from two or more races. Hispanic or Latino of any race were 2.45% of the population.

There were 4,982 households, out of which 24.1% had children under the age of 18 living with them, 42.1% were married couples living together, 12.8% had a female householder with no husband present, and 41.6% were non-families. 33.9% of all households were made up of individuals, and 12.0% had someone living alone who was 65 years of age or older. The average household size was 2.19 and the average family size was 2.80.

In the CDP, the population was spread out, with 20.2% under the age of 18, 6.7% from 18 to 24, 34.2% from 25 to 44, 21.3% from 45 to 64, and 17.6% who were 65 years of age or older. The median age was 38 years. For every 100 females, there were 87.3 males. For every 100 females age 18 and over, there were 83.8 males.

The median income for a household in the CDP was $40,641, and the median income for a family was $47,398. Males had a median income of $32,378 versus $27,343 for females. The per capita income for the CDP was $22,242. About 6.2% of families and 8.0% of the population were below the poverty line, including 15.1% of those under age 18 and 4.6% of those age 65 or over.

References

Census-designated places in Henrico County, Virginia
Census-designated places in Virginia